St Jarlath's College is a Catholic secondary school for young men in Tuam, County Galway. The college was founded in 1800 and in 2009 absorbed St. Patrick's College, Tuam. The College, which operates under patronage of the Archbishop of Tuam, is named after Jarlath, or Iarlaith, who founded a monastery in the town when, as legend has it, his chariot wheel broke.   The enrolment numbers in 2022 are 595.

History

Foundation
The original St Jarlath's College was founded in 1800 by the Archbishop of Tuam Edward Dillon, with the aim of preparing young boys for seminars formation at St Patrick's College, Maynooth. Dr Dillon had to seek permission to establish the college from the Protestant Archbishop of Tuam, Dr Beresford. It began with two thatched cottages at the Mall, Tuam later moving to a new building in Bishop Street, now commonly known as "the Old College".

Its first president was Rev Oliver Kelly, who later became Archbishop of Tuam. In 1824, the facilities of the College were enlarged by the erection of additional houses in Bishop Street and in 1856, the site of the present college and grounds was bought by Archbishop John McHale. This property was known as Keighrey's Park and a portion of it was used as the town's fair green. McHale continued to set it as a fair green to the town commissioners at a yearly rent of 30 until 1875 in which year the college was extensively enlarged by the addition of two wings to the first building which had been erected in 1858.

In 1851, Archbishop John McHale invited the Congregation of Christian Brothers to Tuam. The invitation resulted in the birth of Tuam CBS, and later St Patrick's College, a Catholic day secondary school, which was to play a not insignificant role in the education of young men from the lower orders in Tuam.

Amalgamation

Plans to amalgamate St Patrick's And St Jarlath’s colleges had first been suggested in the late 1990s. At that time, a new school building had been promised by the Government. However, no such building materialised. The phasing out of boarding in St Jarlath's led to a reduced enrolment.

In March 2008, Archbishop Michael Neary (bishop), a trustee of both schools, announced to staff that the amalgamation would proceed in the absence of a new school building. The amalgamation process commenced in September 2008 with enrollment of all first year students in St Jarlath's. The process was completed in September 2009 when students from both schools amalgamated into the new school, in the old St Jarlath's building.

Opera

Starting with The Mikado in 1944, the college's Amateur Operatic Society has performed a yearly musical or opera for the local community. The 1969 production, The Quaker Girl was the first to be held in conjunction with Mercy Convent, Tuam. The 2008 Opera was also in conjunction with St Patrick's College, due to the amalgamation process in progress at the time.

The tradition of the annual Opera was continued following the amalgamation, the 2009 Opera being the first production of the newly amalgamated school. The Opera has been successful in recent years in the Connacht Tribune organised musical awards, winning a Best Overall and a Best Chorus award in 2008 for Hot Mikado.

Sport
The St Jarlath's College's senior football team hold the prestigious record of winning the Hogan Cup 12 times – the first time in 1947  - more than any other school, and have also been runners-up on a further 14 occasions. The college also holds the record for winning the most Connacht Colleges Senior Football Championships, with an outstanding 49 wins.

Since amalgamation, the school has won three Connacht Senior titles, reaching the Hogan Cup Final in 2011. Under the management of Joe Burke, and captained by Ian Burke from Corofin, the school narrowly lost out to St Colman's College, Newry by just one point.

Sporting honours
Connacht Colleges Senior Football Championship : 2022(*covid year))
Paddy Buggy Cup (All-Ireland Colleges Senior 'B' Hurling Championship) : 1
Connacht Colleges Senior Football Championship : 2 (2011, 2012, 2022)
Hogan Cup Runners-Up : 1 (2011)

Notable staff
J. J. Cribbin — worked as Prefect of Studies
Elaine Feeney — Irish writer
Michael Meehan — the former Galway Gaelic footballer teaches mathematics

Selected past pupils

 John Birmingham — well known amateur geologist and astronomer
 John Blowick — co-founder of the Missionary Society of St. Columban
 Thomas Carr — former archbishop of Melbourne, Australia
 Enda Colleran — former Gaelic footballer for, and later manager of, Galway
 Damien Comer — Gaelic footballer for Galway
 J. J. Cribbin  — Gaelic footballer for Mayo, played for the school team
 Seán Óg De Paor — former Gaelic footballer for Galway
 Michael Donnellan — former Gaelic footballer for Galway
 Patrick Duggan — former bishop of Clonfert
 Peter Fallon — Columban priest kidnapped and killed by Japanese forces in 1945 in the Philippines
 Seán Flanagan — Fianna Fáil politician and Gaelic footballer
 John Heneghan — Columban priest kidnapped and killed by Japanese forces in 1945, in the Philippines, alongside Peter Fallon
 Jim Higgins — Member of the European Parliament for the North–West constituency of Ireland
 Monsignor James Horan — Parish Priest of Knock, responsible for the building of Ireland West Airport
 Colm Keaveney — TD, Labour Party and Fianna Fáil
 Thomas J. Kelly — Irish Nationalist and former leader of the Irish Republican Brotherhood
 Mark Killilea — politician, former Member of the European Parliament for the North–West Constituency
 Michael P. Kitt — former Teachta Dála (TD) for the Galway East constituency
 Tom Kitt — former Teachta Dála (TD) for the Dublin South constituency
 Patrick Lavelle - nicknamed Patriot Priest Of Partry
 Seamus Leydon — former Gaelic footballer for Galway
 Patrick Anthony Ludden — first bishop of Syracuse, New York
 Michael Lyster — former RTÉ presenter
 Kevin McStay — former Gaelic footballer, played for the school team
 Michael Meehan — former Gaelic footballer for Galway
 Michael Neary — current archbishop of Tuam
 Patrick O’Boyle- Bishop of Killala, 1950-1970
 John O'Connor Power — M.P. for Mayo (1874-1885), Orator
 John O'Donohoe QC — Senator for Ontario, Canada (1882-1902)
 Seán Purcell — Gaelic footballer for County Galway
 John Sheehy — former British colonial official
 Tomás Tierney — former Gaelic footballer for Galway and Mayo

Presidents

St. Jarlath's College

St Jarlath's College (post-amalgamation)

References

Further reading
 
 Jordan Anthony, J. (2008). The Good Samaritans - Memoir of a Biographer. Westport Books. .

External links
 Tuam Guide

1801 establishments in Ireland
Boys' schools in the Republic of Ireland
Buildings and structures in Tuam
Catholic secondary schools in the Republic of Ireland
Educational institutions established in 1801
Secondary schools in County Galway